"Some Kind of Wonderful" is a song by Gerry Goffin and Carole King that was first released by the Drifters in 1961. (It is not related to another song of the same name which was written by John Ellison and first released by Soul Brothers Six in 1967).

The Drifters' original recording of the Goffin/King song reached No. 32 on the US Billboard pop chart and No. 6 on the US  Billboard R&B chart.

Notable covers include versions by both Little Eva (1962) and her sister Idalia Boyd (1963), Marvin Gaye (1967), Jay and the Americans (1970), Carole King (1971), Peter Cincotti (2004), Aled Jones featuring Cerys Matthews (2007), and Michael Bublé on the deluxe editions of his fourth studio album, Crazy Love (2009).

On the double album The Drifters 24 Original Hits (UK, 1975, Atlantic Records), the song is mistakenly credited to John Ellison. Conversely, on the Q-Tips' self-titled debut album (UK, 1980, Chrysalis Records), the Ellison song is mistakenly credited to Goffin and King

References

1961 singles
1961 songs
The Drifters songs
Marvin Gaye songs
Jay and the Americans songs
Carole King songs
Songs with lyrics by Gerry Goffin
Songs written by Carole King
Atlantic Records singles